A Start in Life is an Australian charity that supports young people in necessitous circumstances access an education equal to their peers.

A Start in Life is a registered charity and does not receive government funding. They depend on the support of individuals, businesses, community groups, philanthropic foundations and trusts. Since its establishment, the charity has provided support to more than 7,000 students aged 4 to 24 years old, valued at over $30.0 million.

Students and families are most often referred to A Start in Life by their school or educational institution, however other sources of referral include welfare agencies such as Department of Family and Community Services (New South Wales) and local community groups, schools and other educational institutions. Self-referrals from students and families seeking support are also encouraged.

The charity has Deductible Gift Recipient status and is Income Tax and FBT exempt.

History
The charity was founded in 1923 by William Thompson (New South Wales politician). Following the death of his son Horace on the Western Front in World War I, William recognised the need to support children of Masons who been impacted by the war. In 1922, he established the William Thompson Masonic School at Baulkham Hills. In 1923 he founded the charity, originally named The NSW Masonic Schools Welfare Fund.

As government welfare and community needs changed over the following years, the charity's constitution was expanded in 1972 to provide educational support to any youth deemed to be in necessitous circumstances, regardless of race, creed, affiliation or any other attributes or backgrounds. At this time, the charity also changed its name to A Start in Life.

Aim
A Start in Life's aim is to assist young Australians in necessitous circumstances overcome barriers to their education, enabling them to reach their potential. By improving the educational outcomes of disadvantaged young people, the charity endeavours to help Australian youth rise above their circumstances, break cycles of disadvantage and enjoy a brighter future.

Student support  
The charity supports primary, secondary and tertiary students. These students and their families are typically facing financial and other hardships, which are acting as barriers to education.

A Start in Life works closely with the parents/carers of primary and secondary students, and directly with tertiary students, to provide support. The charity’s Student Support Team works with parents/carers, students and educators to develop individualised support plans for each student. Tailored learning goals are also created for primary and secondary students.

Support may include:

 School essentials – including school fees, textbooks, stationery and uniforms
 Tuition 
 Internet access, computers, printers and other IT equipment
 Camps and excursions
 Extra-curricular activities
 Living expenses – including accommodation for tertiary students and school lunches
 Work placement assistance and tools of the trade for tertiary students
 Funding for medical conditions

A Start in Life is committed to extending their support to students beyond educational essentials to also facilitate engagement, empowerment, social support, emotional and mental wellbeing. Their assistance is expected to:

 Enhance grades and other academic outcomes, participation and the overall schooling experience
 Develop organisational and study skills
 Build self-esteem, confidence and resilience
 Strengthen social skills and support networks
 Facilitate student and parent/carer engagement
 Actively encourage vocational and professional ambitions

References
Official website

External links 
 Official website

Children's charities based in Australia
Educational charities based in Australia
Organizations established in 1923
Non-profit organisations based in New South Wales
Charities based in Australia